= Rhamphadoretus gallanus =

Scientific classification
- Missing taxonomy template (fix): Rhamphadoretus
- Species: Template:Taxonomy/RhamphadoretusR. gallanus

Binomial name
- Template:Taxonomy/RhamphadoretusRhamphadoretus gallanus (Brenske, 1895)

Synonyms
- Adoretus gallanus Brenske, 1895; Adoretus mustus Kolbe, 1910

Species of beetle

Rhamphadoretus gallanus is a species of beetle of the family Scarabaeidae. It is found in Ethiopia, Kenya and Tanzania.

== Description ==
Adults reach a length of about 7 mm (0.28 in). They are dark with yellowish scales. The third tooth of the fore-tibiae is positioned close to the second and the hairs on the head and pronotum are somewhat longer than those on the elytra, which are sparsely haired, with narrow white scales situated where the ridges would be. The smaller claw on all feet is very narrow and fine.
